Asteridea nivea  is a herb in the Asteraceae family, which is endemic to Western Australia.  It was first described in 1845 by Joachim Steetz as Chrysodiscus niveus.  In 1980, G. Kroner assigned it to the genus, Asteridea, giving it the name Asteridea nivea. It is a perennial herb, sometimes erect, sometimes low-spreading which grows on sandy soils often over granite, laterite, or limestone to heights from 10 cm to 60 cm, in rock crevices, on ridges and coastal cliffs. Its white to white-pink flowers may seen from April to May or August to September in Beard's South-West Province, that is, the IBRA regions of Avon Wheatbelt, Esperance Plains, Geraldton Sandplains, Jarrah Forest, Mallee,  and Warren.

References

External links 
 Asteridea nivea occurrence data from the Australasian Virtual Herbarium

nivea
Endemic flora of Western Australia
Eudicots of Western Australia
Plants described in 1845